Ryan Holiday (born June 16, 1987) is an American author, modern Stoic,
public-relations strategist, owner of the Painted Porch Bookshop and host of the podcast The Daily Stoic. Prior to becoming an author, he served as the former director of marketing and eventually an advisor for American Apparel. Holiday's debut to writing was in 2012, when he published Trust Me, I'm Lying. Holiday's notable works include his books on Stoic philosophy, such as The Obstacle Is the Way, Ego is the Enemy, Stillness is the Key, Courage is Calling, and Lives of the Stoics.

Career

Early career
Holiday began his professional career after dropping out of college at the age of 19. He attended University of California, Riverside, where he studied political science and creative writing. He consulted for author Tucker Max and, later, he worked with Robert Greene, author of The 48 Laws of Power, on Greene's 2009 New York Times bestselling book, The 50th Law. Holiday served as Director of Marketing for American Apparel and, later, as an adviser to the company. He left the company in October 2014. He has consulted on a number of media campaigns and written extensively on the topic of media manipulation.

Writing
Holiday is the author of several books and has written for Forbes, Fast Company, The Huffington Post, The Columbia Journalism Review, The Guardian, Thought Catalog, Medium.com, New York Observer, The New York Times and Texas Monthly. Books he has authored have sold more than three million copies combined.

Holiday published his first book, a media exposé about the state of online journalism called Trust Me, I'm Lying, in July 2012, which debuted on the Wall Street Journal bestseller list. His second book Growth Hacker Marketing was originally published in September 2013 by Portfolio/Penguin and then expanded into a print edition in 2014. The book shows how traditional marketing efforts are no longer the most effective, and why growth hacking is cheaper and more effective in today's market. The book was named one of Inc. magazine's top 10 marketing books of 2014.

In February 2014, Holiday was named editor-at-large of the Business & Technology section at the New York Observer.

Holiday's third book The Obstacle Is the Way, was published May 1, 2014, also by Portfolio/Penguin. The book is based on the Stoic exercise of framing obstacles as opportunities. The book has sold more than 1 million copies and was read by the New England Patriots during their 2014 Super Bowl-winning season, as well as distributed through the locker room of the Seattle Seahawks in the following offseason. The Obstacle Is the Way reached No. 1 on the Wall Street Journal Bestseller List in 2019, five years after its initial release. Two-time NBA Champion Chris Bosh listed The Obstacle Is the Way as his favorite book and added that, when his head coach Erik Spoelstra gifted Miami Heat players copies of the book, Bosh had already read it twice. During a press conference at the Masters in 2019, four-time major champion golfer Rory McIlroy said he read The Obstacle Is the Way as well as Holiday's following book, Ego Is the Enemy, leading up to the tournament. In the months following former Pittsburgh Steelers linebacker Ryan Shazier's on-field spinal injury that left him unable to walk, Shazier credited The Obstacle Is The Way for helping him improve his mindset and focus on recovery.

In 2016, he published two books. The first, Ego Is the Enemy, uses various historical figures as case studies to illustrate the perils of egotism. The second, The Daily Stoic, is a daily devotional of Stoic meditations. Both books went on to become bestsellers with Daily Stoic reaching No. 1 on the Wall Street Journal bestseller list.

In 2018, he published Conspiracy: Peter Thiel, Hulk Hogan, Gawker, and the Anatomy of Intrigue. It is about the lawsuit between Gawker Media and wrestler Hulk Hogan, as well as Peter Thiel's involvement in the dispute. It was favorably reviewed by William D. Cohan of The New York Times, who called the book, "one helluva page-turner." Conspiracy is being developed into a feature film with Charles Randolph writing the script and Francis Lawrence attached as the director. In October 2019, he published Stillness Is the Key, which became the first of Holiday's books to reach No. 1 on the New York Times bestseller list. Stillness Is the Key argues for a balanced approach to life, of limiting the amount of "noise" and while mostly referencing stoicism, he also makes references to Buddhism, Confucianism, Taoism as well as the Abrahamic religions. In 2020, he published Lives of the Stoics, which he wrote with author Stephen Hanselman. The book is a collection of biographies for more than two dozen philosophers who lived according to the stoic virtues of courage, temperance and wisdom.

He has written a chapter in Tim Ferriss' book Tools of Titans.

Stoicism
While Holiday was a college student, Dr. Drew recommended Epictetus which inspired Holiday's interest in stoicism. Holiday, through his books, articles and lectures, has been credited by The New York Times with the increasing popularity of stoicism. He was also described as "leading the charge for stoicism," which has been noted for gaining traction among Silicon Valley entrepreneurs. Classicist Gregory Hays, whose 2002 translation of Marcus Aurelius's Meditations became a bestseller, provided commentary on Holiday's stoic writing by saying it is, "very much in the spirit of his ancient models" and added, "Holiday is also a great teller of stories."

Personal life

Holiday wrote public letters encouraging his father not to vote for Donald Trump in 2016 and 2020. Despite his public opposition to Trump's 2016 Presidential campaign, Holiday was offered a communications director position within the Trump administration, which he did not accept. Holiday supported Joe Biden in the 2020 United States presidential election. He said: "For those asking what happened to the Biden sign...we hung it up on our ranch in Texas, where we own guns, raise cows for meat, prefer low taxes, fly an American flag, and mostly want to be left alone. It's perfectly possible to have "conservative" beliefs and know what the obvious right thing to do in 2020 is." In September 2020, Holiday initiated a funding drive and personally contributed $10,000 toward the removal of two Confederate monuments from the Bastrop County Courthouse and the courthouse approved the removal and relocation of the monuments to an alternative site in February 2021.

Holiday owns and operates the independent bookstore Painted Porch Bookshop in Bastrop, Texas. He is married and has two sons. He lives on a 40-acre ranch in Bastrop County, Texas.

See also
 Modern Stoicism

Bibliography

References

External links
 Official Website

Living people
American male writers
Writers from Sacramento, California
1987 births
Propaganda theorists
Public relations theorists
Marketing people
Marketing theorists
University of California, Riverside alumni